Akaler Shandhaney ("In Search of Famine") is a 1982 Indian Bengali film directed by Mrinal Sen.

Plot 

In September 1980, a film crew comes to a village to make a film about a famine, which killed five million Bangalis in 1943. It was a man-made famine, a side-product of the war, and the film crew will create the tragedy of those millions who died of starvation. The film documents the convivial life among the film crew and the hazards, problems and tension of filmmaking on location. The actors live a double life, and the villagers, both simple and not-so-simple, flock to watch their work with wonder and suspicion. But as the film progresses, the recreated past begins to confront the present. The uneasy coexistence of 1943 and 1980 reveals a bizarre connection, involving a village woman whose visions add a further dimension of time—that of the future. A disturbing situation, indeed, for the "famine-seekers"!

Cast 
Dhritiman Chatterjee
Smita Patil
Gita Sen
Rajen Tarafdar
Sreela Mazumder
Radhamohan Bhattachariya
Jayanta Chowdhury
Dipankar De
Jochhan Dastidar

Awards

 1981 - National Film Award for Best Feature Film
 1981 - National Film Award for Best Direction - Mrinal Sen
 1981 - National Film Award for Best Screenplay - Mrinal Sen
 1981 - National Film Award for Best Editing - Gangadhar Naskar
 1981 - 31st Berlin International Film Festival - Silver Bear - Special Jury Prize.

References

External links

1980 films
Bengali-language Indian films
Films directed by Mrinal Sen
Films whose director won the Best Director National Film Award
Best Feature Film National Film Award winners
Films about famine
Films whose editor won the Best Film Editing National Award
Bengali film scores by Salil Chowdhury
Films whose writer won the Best Original Screenplay National Film Award
1980s Bengali-language films
Silver Bear Grand Jury Prize winners